James B. Brown House, also known as Stonecroft Manor, is a historic home located near Hannibal, Ralls County, Missouri.  It was built between 1870 and 1872, and is a two-story, five bay, rubble limestone I-house with a central passage plan.  It features a Greek Revival style front porch and Italianate details.  It has a truncated hip roof and the one-story rear ell also has a hipped roof.  It was built as a summer home for James Brown a prominent local citizen of Hannibal, Missouri.

It was listed on the National Register of Historic Places in 1984.

References

Houses on the National Register of Historic Places in Missouri
Greek Revival architecture in Missouri
Italianate architecture in Missouri
Houses completed in 1872
Houses in Ralls County, Missouri
National Register of Historic Places in Ralls County, Missouri